Zak Gibson (born 19 March 1997) is a New Zealand cricketer. He made his first-class debut for Northern Districts on 15 March 2016 in the 2015–16 Plunket Shield. He made his Twenty20 debut for Northern Districts on 4 December 2016 in the 2016–17 Super Smash. He made his List A debut for Northern Districts on 15 January 2017 in the 2016–17 Ford Trophy. In June 2018, he was awarded a contract with Northern Districts for the 2018–19 season.

References

External links
 

1997 births
Living people
New Zealand cricketers
Northern Districts cricketers
Cricketers from Hamilton, New Zealand